The following is a list of jarls and dukes, who ruled over Schleswig respectively Southern Jutland (Sønderjylland).

First jarls/dukes

Houses of Estridsen and Schauenburg (1080–1460)

House of Oldenburg

In 1864, following the Second Schleswig War, the Duchy of Schleswig-Holstein became an occupied territory of the German Confederation and two years later, following the Austro-Prussian War, part of the new Prussian Province of Schleswig-Holstein.

See also
List of Danish monarchs
List of rulers of Schleswig-Holstein

Notes

Lists of Danish people
Lists of monarchs
Dukedoms of Germany
People from the Duchy of Schleswig

Lists of dukes